The Portuguese conquest of French Guiana, also known as Conquest of Cayenne (Portuguese: Conquista de Caiena), was a military operation against Cayenne, capital of the South American colony of French Guiana, launched in January 1809 in the context of the Napoleonic Wars. The invasion was undertaken by a combined expeditionary force that included Portuguese (from Portugal and from Colonial Brazil) and British military contingents.

The invasion was part of a series of attacks on French-held territory in the Americas during 1809, and due to commitments elsewhere, the British Royal Navy was unable to send substantial forces to attack the fortified river port. Instead, appeals were made to the Portuguese government, which had fled Portugal the year before during the Peninsular War and was resident in Brazil, its largest colony. In exchange for providing troops and transports for the operation, the Portuguese were promised Guiana as an expansion of their holdings in Brazil for the duration of the conflict.

The British contribution was small, consisting solely of the minor warship HMS Confiance. Confiance however had a highly effective crew and an experienced captain in James Lucas Yeo, who was to command the entire expedition. The more substantial Portuguese contingent consisted of 700 regular soldiers of the colonial Army of Brazil, led by Lieutenant-colonel Manuel Marques de Elva Portugal, 550 marines of the Royal Brigade of the Navy detached in Brazil and several warships to act as transports and provide offshore artillery support. The French defenders were weakened by years of Royal Navy blockade and could only muster 400 regular infantry and 800 unreliable militia, formed in part from the territory's free black population. As a result, resistance was inconsistent and despite Cayenne's strong fortifications, the territory fell within a week.

It is considered to be the baptism of fire of the Brazilian Marine Corps, as there was a participation of the Royal Brigade of the Navy that would give origin to it.

Background
During the Napoleonic Wars, French colonial territories in the Caribbean were a drain on both the French and British navies. The fortified harbours on the islands and coastal towns provided shelter for French warships and privateers that could strike against British trade routes at will, forcing the Royal Navy to divert extensive resources to protect their convoys. However, the maintenance and support of these bases was a significant task for the French Navy. It had suffered a series of defeats during the war that left it blockaded in its own harbours and unable to put to sea without attack from British squadrons waiting off the coast. Cut off from French trade and supplies, the Caribbean colonies began to suffer from food shortages and collapsing economies, and messages were sent to France in the summer of 1808 requesting urgent help.

Some of these messages were intercepted by the patrolling Royal Navy.  Based on the description in those messages of the low morale and weak defences of the Caribbean territories, the decision was taken to eliminate the threat from the French colonies for the remainder of the war by seizing and occupying them in a series of amphibious operations. Command of this campaign was given to Rear-Admiral Sir Alexander Cochrane, who focused his initial efforts on Martinique, gathering a substantial force of ships and men at Barbados in preparation for the planned invasion. While the main British forces concentrated in the Leeward Islands, smaller expeditionary forces were sent to watch other French colonies, including the small ship HMS Confiance, deployed to the northern coast of South America under Captain James Lucas Yeo. Supplementing this meagre force were reinforcements provided by Rear-Admiral Sir Sidney Smith, the commander of the Brazil Station who had negotiated with the Portuguese government, then situated in Brazil, where they had been forced to relocate in 1808 following the French invasion that began the Peninsular War.

Smith had secured the assistance of a Portuguese squadron, consisting of two armed brigs, Voador (24 guns) and Vingança (18 guns), an unarmed brig, Infante Dom Pedro, and the unarmed  cutter Leão.

This force carried at least 550 regular Portuguese soldiers, supplemented by sailors and marines on board the ships, all under the command of Lieutenant-Colonel Manuel Marques. Yeo, who was to retain overall command of the operation, joined the Portuguese force off Belém in early December 1808.  On 15 December he attacked the coastal districts of Oyapok and Appruage, seizing both without resistance, in preparation for the advance on Cayenne, the capital of French Guiana.

Invasion

The town of Cayenne is situated on an island in the mouth of the Cayenne and Mahury Rivers. In 1809, its approaches were protected by a series of forts and gun batteries, while the town itself was dominated by a modern star fort. Acknowledging that his force was not large enough to invade the island directly, Yeo decided instead to attack a series of outlying forts on the Mahury River in an effort to draw out the French defenders. On 6 January 1809, preparations were complete and Yeo launched an attack during the night, landing at Pointe Mahury at 03:00 on 7 January in five canoes despite heavy rains, which continued throughout the campaign. The surf was strong and all five canoes were wrecked on the beach, but there were no casualties. Yeo detached a Portuguese force under Major Joaquim Manuel Pinto against the Dégras de Cannes battery while he advanced on Fort Diamant with a force of seamen and marines. Both positions were rapidly carried, the British suffering seven men wounded to French losses of six killed and four wounded. Four cannons were seized, as were 90 French soldiers. Both fortifications were then garrisoned with soldiers from the squadron.

With the capture of the Mahury forts, the French in Cayenne risked being cut off from external help and besieged. In response, Governor Victor Hugues mustered most of the 600 troops available to him and marched on the Allied positions. Consolidating his forces at Dégras de Cannes, Yeo demolished Fort Diamant and sent scouts down river, where two further forts were discovered at Trio and the Canal de Torcy. The latter fort had been constructed to defend the approaches to Hugues' residence, which was situated on the canal. Yeo immediately ordered the Portuguese cutters Leão and Vingança into the river to attack the forts, the Portuguese bombarding the positions for an hour while Yeo prepared assault forces. Yeo himself led the attack on the Trio fort while a Portuguese party attacked the fort on the canal. Both positions were captured and their 50 strong garrisons driven off.

As Yeo secured his position from attack from the river, Hugues arrived at Dégras de Cannes. Despite attacking Lieutenant Colonel Marques' garrison immediately, Hugues was unable to defeat the Portuguese before Yeo returned, and was forced to retreat after a three-hour engagement. A secondary force sent against Fort Diamant saw the British demolition party on the walls and, assuming the garrison there to be larger than expected, retreated without an assault. The following morning, as Hugues fell back on his residence, Yeo followed, using the river and canal to close with the position. Hugues had fortified his property with 100 men and two artillery pieces, and ordered his men to fire on a party of British sailors offering a truce. A second attempt was met with cannon fire, and although a third attempt via one of Hugues' slaves drew a response, the French general's overtures were only an attempt to stall the Allies while his men laid an ambush in the trees near their landing point.

At a signal from one of the artillery pieces, the French ambush party began a heavy fire on the troops advancing up the lane towards the house. Charging forward, Yeo led an attack on the ambushers at the head of his men and in hand-to-hand fighting seized the house and its artillery. Gathering his forces, Yeo then marched on Cayenne, expecting to meet Hugues at the Beauregard plain, where the French general had stationed his remaining 400 men. Reaching the position on 10 January, Yeo sent two junior officers into Cayenne offering an armistice, which was accepted, Hugues recognising that he was outnumbered and outmanoeuvred. Over the next four days, Yeo's men took the surrender of the outlying French garrisons and units, with the entrance to Cayenne planned for 14 January.

Topaze
To Yeo's consternation, dawn on 13 January showed a sail approaching from the north. This vessel was the French frigate Topaze, a powerful 40-gun vessel that was significantly stronger than any of the British or Portuguese ships in the expeditionary force (the large Infante Dom Pedro having returned to Brazil some time earlier). Topaze had been sent from France under Captain Pierre-Nicolas Lahalle to reinforce the Cayenne garrison in December 1808. In addition to extra troops and military supplies, Topaze's main cargo was 1,100 barrels of flour, Cayenne suffering from severe food shortages due to the British blockade of the French Caribbean. Lahalle was cautious on approaching Cayenne, and soon spotted Confiance at anchor off the harbour.

Confiance, as a 20-gun ship armed with short range carronades, was significantly weaker than Topaze; more critically, she was also almost completely uncrewed, as Yeo had removed all but 25 men and two midshipmen for service with the expeditionary force on land.  If Lahalle closed with the ship, the senior officer, Midshipman George Yeo, the captain's much younger brother, would have no option but to surrender, leaving the landing party cut off and at risk of total defeat. Reacting quickly, George Yeo mustered 20 local men, all free black civilians, and pressed them into service to complement his skeleton crew. He then sailed from the harbour in an aggressive manner, as if to confront Topaze. Lahalle was under instructions to avoid combat if it placed his cargo in jeopardy and assumed that such a small vessel would not approach his frigate unless heavier support was hidden nearby, unwilling to risk losing his ship, he turned and sailed north, rapidly outdistancing Confiance and disappearing over the horizon in the belief that the British had already captured Cayenne. Nine days later, as he neared Guadeloupe, Lahalle was spotted by a genuinely larger British squadron and defeated at the action of 22 January 1809.

French capitulation
With the French reinforcements driven off and its defences broken, a proposal for capitulation was made to Hugues on January 10, which he accepted the next day when he met with Lieutenant-colonel Marques. The terms of capitulation included, among other things, the departure, abord ships arranged by the invaders, of the French troops and staff with honours of war, the passage to mainland France aboard the same ships to other French individuals desiring to do so, and the preservation of the recently implemented Napoleonic civil code in the colony by the new Portuguese administration. On 20 April 1809 the warship Infante Dom Pedro, commanded by the Brazilian captain Luiz da Cunha Moreira, arrived in the port of Morlaix with Hugues and his staff.

Entering Cayenne on 14 January, Yeo's Anglo-Portuguese force took Hugues' 400 regular soldiers into captivity and collected the arms of 600 white militia and 200 black irregulars, all of whom were allowed to return to their homes. Included in the surrender were 200 cannon, all military and government stores, and all of the various villages and trading posts of French Guiana, which stretched from the Brazilian border to the Maroni River, which marked the border with the British-held Dutch territory of Surinam.

Casualties in the operation were light, the British losing a lieutenant killed and 23 men wounded, the Portuguese one man killed and eight wounded and the French 16 killed and 20 wounded. The French prisoners were embarked on the expeditionary force's ships and taken to Brazil, and the colony was handed over to the Portuguese government for administration, with the stipulation that it be returned to France at the end of the war.

La Gabriele
There was, in the region of Cayenne, a famous agricultural complex maintained by the French crown, formed by the Habitation Royale des Épiceries, better known as La Gabriele, by the Habitation de Mont-Baduel, by the Habitation Tilsit and by the Wood Factory of Nancibo, were the main ones examples of colonial establishments in Guyana, in extent, productivity and number of slaves. [10]

The possession of La Gabriele would become one of the greatest benefits obtained by the Portuguese with the annexation of such a troubled colony. In addition to being one of the main sources of income for the colony, it brought together all the plant species coveted by the Portuguese. [10] In April 1809, Rodrigo de Sousa Coutinho, responsible for the Brazilian vegetable gardens, sent the governor of the captaincy of Grão-Pará to provide transportation, from Cayenne to Belém and to other domains, "of the greatest possible amount of all spice trees". Together with them, they should follow "skilled gardeners", as long as they are not "contaminated with liberal ideology". In the same month, a new order determined the transfer of plants from the Pará garden to Rio de Janeiro, remembering that the search for "all kinds of cultures" was the "most essential point for Brazil" at that time. [10] It was the French administrator of La Gabriele, Joseph Martin, who signed the list of plants and instructions for planting, in total, 82 species shipped in six boxes. [10]

During the Portuguese occupation, various spices and fruits were sent to Brazil, such as nutmeg, cloves, breadfruit, in addition to walnut, camboeira, avocado and cayenne seedlings, much superior to sugar cane. then grown in Brazil. [6] This collection would be one of the precursors to the creation of the Rio de Janeiro Botanical Garden. [10]

Aftermath

Yeo's later career
Yeo was highly commended for his leadership during the operation, but his health had suffered during the extended campaigning in late December and was invalided to Rio de Janeiro to recover. On his return to active service, he was presented with a diamond ring by the Portuguese Prince Regent and knighted by both the Portuguese and British Royal families for his service in the campaign. He was subsequently made commander of the frigate HMS Southampton. Four decades later the battle was among the actions recognised by the clasp "Confiance 14 Jany. 1809" attached to the Naval General Service Medal, awarded upon application to all British claimants.

Return to French rule

After Napoleon's first abdication, in 1814, it was decided that the colony would be returned to French control in the Treaty of Paris. Portugal and the restored Bourbon monarchy reached an agreement in the Final Act of the Congress of Vienna, by which Portugal committed itself to return the territory to France, keeping the Oyapock River as its border with Brazil as defined by the 1713 Treaty of Utrecht, and that a date for return would be determined "as soon as circumstances allow it". On 8 November 1817, a French fleet arrived with Cayenne's new governor, Claude Carra Saint-Cyr, to take formal repossession of the territory. The expedition was commanded by Alexandre Ferdinand Parseval-Deschenes, who then headed the French naval station in the colony for two years.

Notes

References 
 
 Esparteiro, Comandante António Marques (1976) Catálogo Dos Navios Brigantinos (1640–1910). (Lisbon: Centro de Estudos de Marinha)
 
 
 
 

Portuguese conquest
Conflicts in 1809
1809 in South America
1809 in the French colonial empire
1809 in the Portuguese Empire
19th century in French Guiana
Battles of the Napoleonic Wars
Battles involving Portugal
Battles involving Brazil
Battles involving the United Kingdom
19th-century history of the Royal Navy
January 1809 events
France–Portugal military relations
Invasions by Portugal